Frank C. Stanley (born William Stanley Grinsted, 29 December 1868 – 12 December 1910) was a popular American singer, banjoist and recording artist active in the 1890s and the 1900s. 

William Stanley Grinsted was born on 29 December 1868 in Orange, New Jersey. He first recorded banjo solos under his own name in October 1891 for Edison then began recording vocal records in 1898 for the National and Norcross Phonograph Companies under the name Frank C. Stanley. He recorded prolifically for Columbia, Victor and Zonophone disc records between 1901 and 1910, alone and as a member of the Columbia and Peerless Quartets. In 1904, The Peerless Quartet consisted of tenors Henry Burr and Albert Campbell, baritone Steve Porter, and bass Tom Daniels. In 1906 Frank C. Stanley replaced Daniels and assumed lead singing and managing responsibilities. He died of pleurisy on 12 December 1910 at his home in Orange.

References

External links

 
  
 Frank C. Stanley recordings at the Discography of American Historical Recordings.
 

1868 births
1910 deaths
Deaths from pleurisy
People from Orange, New Jersey
Pioneer recording artists
19th-century American male singers
19th-century American singers